Sorting and assembly machinery component 50 homolog is a protein that in humans is encoded by the SAMM50 gene.

Clinical significance

By means of exome sequencing, two variants - P377A and V231I on the SAMM50 gene were determined to have a potential relationship to the disease phenotype of Ezra, 9 year old male with Epilepsy, ESES, Hemiplegic Migraine, Exocrine Pancreatic Insuffiency, CSID, Global Apraxia, developmental regressions. History of torticollis, psychomotor regression, colitis as well as Carnitine Deficiency. If you are reading this and have a child/patient/loved one with any of these variants or another variant on SAMM50 with any similarities in phenotype, please edit this section so that we can connect.

References

Further reading